Nathaniel Milton Gaston (January 27, 1896 – April 26, 1996) was an American right-handed pitcher in Major League Baseball from 1924 to 1934. Born in Ridgefield Park, New Jersey, he played for the St. Louis Browns, New York Yankees, Boston Red Sox, Washington Senators and Chicago White Sox. He died at age 100 in Barnstable, Massachusetts. His older brother, Alex, was his batterymate with the 1929 Red Sox. Danny MacFayden was his brother-in-law.

His first roommate in the majors was Lou Gehrig when he played for the New York Yankees.

Three of Babe Ruth's record-setting home runs during the 1927 New York Yankees season were hit off Gaston, on July 26, July 27 and Sept. 11.

Gaston's career record was 97–164. He is the major league record holder for most games under .500 in a career.

A good hitting pitcher in his 11-year major league career, he posted a .200 batting average (145-for-724) with 55 runs, 6 home runs and 75 RBIs.

External links

Interview with Milt Gaston conducted by Eugene Murdock on January 3, 1980, in Bradenton, Florida.

1896 births
1996 deaths
Major League Baseball pitchers
St. Louis Browns players
Chicago White Sox players
New York Yankees players
Boston Red Sox players
Washington Senators (1901–1960) players
Baseball players from New Jersey
American centenarians
Men centenarians
People from Ridgefield Park, New Jersey
Sportspeople from Bergen County, New Jersey